The men's hammer throw was a track & field athletics event at the 1900 Summer Olympics in Paris, the sport's first Olympic appearance. It was held on July 16, 1900. Five hammer throwers from two nations competed. The event was won by John Flanagan of the United States, the first of his three consecutive victories in the hammer throw. The American team swept the medals, with Truxtun Hare finishing second and Josiah McCracken third.

Background

This was the first appearance of the event, which has been held at every Summer Olympics except 1896. Two nations competed: the United States and Sweden. The Americans were familiar with the event; the Swedes were not.

Competition format

The format of the competition is unclear. The throwing area was a nine-foot circle.

Records

These were the standing world and Olympic records (in metres) prior to the 1900 Summer Olympics.

* Flanagan represented the United Kingdom of Great Britain and Ireland before becoming a US citizen.

** unofficial

John Flanagan set the first Olympic record for this event with 51.01 metres.

Schedule

Results

References

Sources
 International Olympic Committee.
 De Wael, Herman. Herman's Full Olympians: "Athletics 1900". Accessed 18 March 2006.
 

Men's throwing hammer
Hammer throw at the Olympics